Dorothy Parker (née Rothschild; August 22, 1893 – June 7, 1967) was an American poet, writer, critic, and satirist based in New York; she was known for her wit, wisecracks, and eye for 20th-century urban foibles.

From a conflicted and unhappy childhood, Parker rose to acclaim, both for her literary works published in magazines, such as The New Yorker, and as a founding member of the Algonquin Round Table. Following the breakup of the circle, Parker traveled to Hollywood to pursue screenwriting. Her successes there, including two Academy Award nominations, were curtailed when her involvement in left-wing politics resulted in her being placed on the Hollywood blacklist.

Dismissive of her own talents, she deplored her reputation as a "wisecracker." Nevertheless, both her literary output and reputation for sharp wit have endured. Some of her works have been set to music; adaptations included the operatic song cycle Hate Songs by composer Marcus Paus.

Early life and education 
Also known as Dot or Dottie,  Parker was born Dorothy Rothschild in 1893 to Jacob Henry Rothschild and his wife Eliza Annie (née Marston) (1851–1898) at 732 Ocean Avenue in Long Branch, New Jersey. Her parents had a summer beach cottage there. Parker's mother was of Scottish descent. Her father was the son of Sampson Jacob Rothschild (1818–1899) and Mary Greissman (b. 1824), both Prussian-born Jews. Sampson Jacob Rothschild was a merchant who immigrated to the United States around 1846, settling in Monroe County, Alabama. Jacob Henry Rothschild was one of five known siblings. The others were Simon (1854–1908); Samuel (b. 1857); Hannah (1860–1911), later Mrs. William Henry Theobald; and Martin, born in Manhattan on December 12, 1865, who perished in the sinking of the Titanic in 1912. Parker wrote in her essay, "My Home Town," that her parents returned to their Manhattan apartment shortly after Labor Day so that she could be called a true New Yorker. Her mother died in Manhattan in July 1898, a month before Parker's fifth birthday.

Her father remarried in 1900 to Eleanor Frances Lewis (1851–1903). Parker hated her father, who physically abused her, and her stepmother, whom she refused to call "mother," "stepmother," or "Eleanor," instead referring to her as "the housekeeper." However, her biographer, Marion Meade, refers to this account as "largely false," stating that the atmosphere in which Parker was growing up was indulgent, affectionate, supportive and generous. Parker grew up on the Upper West Side and attended a Roman Catholic elementary school at the Convent of the Blessed Sacrament on West 79th Street with her sister, Helen, although their father was Jewish and her stepmother was Protestant. (Mercedes de Acosta was a classmate.) Parker once joked that she was asked to leave following her characterization of the Immaculate Conception as "spontaneous combustion." Her stepmother died in 1903, when Parker was nine. Parker later attended Miss Dana's School, a finishing school in Morristown, New Jersey. She graduated from Miss Dana's School in 1911, at the age of 18, according to Authur, although Rhonda Pettit and Marion Meade state she never graduated from either school. Following her father's death in 1913, she played piano at a dancing school to earn a living while she worked on her poetry.

She sold her first poem to Vanity Fair magazine in 1914 and some months later was hired as an editorial assistant for Vogue, another Condé Nast magazine. She moved to Vanity Fair as a staff writer after two years at Vogue.

In 1917, she met a Wall Street stockbroker, Edwin Pond Parker II
(1893–1933) and they married before he left to serve in World War I with the U.S. Army 4th Division. Dorothy Parker filed for divorce in 1928. He later remarried, to Anne E. O’Brien, former probation officer of the Juvenile Court, and died at 39, following a dental procedure. It is disputed whether he died from an overdose of analgesic or sepsis resulting from multiple tooth extractions. Dorothy Parker retained her married name, though she remarried the screenwriter and former actor Alan Campbell, and moved to Hollywood.

Algonquin Round Table years 

Parker's career took off in 1918 while she was writing theater criticism for Vanity Fair, filling in for the vacationing P. G. Wodehouse. At the magazine, she met Robert Benchley, who became a close friend, and Robert E. Sherwood. The trio began lunching at the Algonquin Hotel on a near-daily basis and became founding members of what became known as the Algonquin Round Table. The Round Table numbered among its members the newspaper columnists Franklin Pierce Adams and Alexander Woollcott. Through their publication of Parker's lunchtime remarks and short verses, particularly in Adams' column "The Conning Tower", Dorothy began developing a national reputation as a wit. When the group was informed that famously taciturn former president Calvin Coolidge had died, Parker remarked, "How could they tell?"

Parker's caustic wit as a critic initially proved popular, but she was eventually dismissed by Vanity Fair in 1920 after her criticisms too often offended powerful producers. In solidarity, Benchley resigned in protest. (Sherwood is sometimes reported to have done so as well, but in actuality he had been fired in December 1919.) She soon started working for Ainslee's Magazine, which had a higher circulation. She also published pieces in Vanity Fair, which was happier to publish her than employ her, The Smart Set, and The American Mercury, but also in the popular Ladies’ Home Journal, Saturday Evening Post, and Life.

When Harold Ross founded The New Yorker in 1925, Parker and Benchley were part of a board of editors established by Ross to allay the concerns of his investors. Parker's first piece for the magazine was published in its second issue. Parker became famous for her short, viciously humorous poems, many highlighting ludicrous aspects of her many (largely unsuccessful) romantic affairs and others wistfully considering the appeal of suicide.

The next 15 years were Parker's greatest period of productivity and success. In the 1920s alone she published some 300 poems and free verses in Vanity Fair, Vogue, "The Conning Tower" and The New Yorker as well as Life, McCall's and The New Republic.  Her poem, "Song in a Minor Key" was published during a candid interview with New York N.E.A. writer Josephine van der Grift.

Parker published her first volume of poetry, Enough Rope, in 1926. The collection sold 47,000 copies and garnered impressive reviews. The Nation described her verse as "caked with a salty humor, rough with splinters of disillusion, and tarred with a bright black authenticity." Although some critics, notably The New York Times reviewer, dismissed her work as "flapper verse," the volume helped affirm Parker's reputation for sparkling wit. Parker released two more volumes of verse, Sunset Gun (1928) and Death and Taxes (1931), along with the short story collections Laments for the Living (1930) and After Such Pleasures (1933). Not So Deep as a Well (1936) collected much of the material previously published in Rope, Gun, and Death and she re-released her fiction with a few new pieces in 1939 under the title Here Lies.

She collaborated with playwright Elmer Rice to create Close Harmony, which ran on Broadway in December 1924. The play was well received in out-of-town previews and was favorably reviewed in New York, but it closed after a run of only 24 performances. It became a successful touring production under the title The Lady Next Door.

Some of Parker's most popular work was published in The New Yorker in the form of acerbic book reviews under the byline "Constant Reader". Her response to the whimsy of A. A. Milne's The House at Pooh Corner was "Tonstant Weader fwowed up." Her reviews appeared semi-regularly from 1927 to 1933, were widely read, and were posthumously published in a collection under the name Constant Reader in 1970.

Her best-known short story, "Big Blonde", published in The Bookman magazine, was awarded the O. Henry Award as the best short story of 1929. Her short stories, though often witty, were also spare and incisive, and more bittersweet than comic; her style is often described as sardonic.

Parker eventually separated from her husband, divorcing in 1928. She had a number of affairs, her lovers including reporter-turned-playwright Charles MacArthur and the publisher Seward Collins. Her relationship with MacArthur resulted in a pregnancy. Parker is alleged to have said, "how like me, to put all my eggs into one bastard.” She had an abortion, and fell into a depression that culminated in her first attempt at suicide.

Toward the end of this period, Parker began to become more politically aware and active. What would become a lifelong commitment to activism began in 1927, when she became concerned about the pending executions of Sacco and Vanzetti. Parker traveled to Boston to protest the proceedings. She and fellow Round Tabler Ruth Hale were arrested, and Parker eventually pleaded guilty to a charge of "loitering and sauntering", paying a $5 fine.

Hollywood 
In 1932, Parker met Alan Campbell, an actor with aspirations to become a screenwriter. They married two years later in Raton, New Mexico. Campbell's mixed parentage was the reverse of Parker's: he had a German-Jewish mother and a Scottish father. She learned that he was bisexual and later proclaimed in public that he was "queer as a billy goat". The pair moved to Hollywood and signed ten-week contracts with Paramount Pictures, with Campbell (who was also expected to act) earning $250 per week and Parker earning $1,000 per week. They would eventually earn $2,000 and in some instances upwards of $5,000 per week as freelancers for various studios. She and Campbell worked on more than 15 films.

In 1935, Parker contributed lyrics for the song "I Wished on the Moon", with music by Ralph Rainger. The song was introduced in The Big Broadcast of 1936 by Bing Crosby.

With Campbell and Robert Carson, she wrote the script for the 1937 film A Star Is Born, for which they were nominated for an Academy Award for Best Writing—Screenplay. She wrote additional dialogue for The Little Foxes in 1941. Together with Frank Cavett, she received a nomination for an Oscar for the screenplay of Smash-Up, the Story of a Woman (1947), starring Susan Hayward.

After the United States entered the Second World War, Parker and Alexander Woollcott collaborated to produce an anthology of her work as part of a series published by Viking Press for servicemen stationed overseas. With an introduction by W. Somerset Maugham, the volume compiled over two dozen of Parker's short stories, along with selected poems from Enough Rope, Sunset Gun, and Death and Taxes. It was published in the United States in 1944 under the title The Portable Dorothy Parker. Hers is one of three volumes in the Portable series, including volumes devoted to William Shakespeare and The Bible, that have remained in continuous print.

During the 1930s and 1940s, Parker became an increasingly vocal advocate of civil liberties and civil rights, and a frequent critic of authority figures. During the Great Depression, she was among numerous American intellectuals and artists who became involved in related social movements. She reported in 1937 on the Loyalist cause in Spain for the Communist magazine, 'The New Masses.' At the behest of Otto Katz, a covert Soviet Comintern agent and operative of German Communist Party agent Willi Münzenberg, Parker helped to found the Hollywood Anti-Nazi League in 1936, which the FBI suspected of being a Communist Party front. The Hollywood Anti-Nazi League's membership eventually grew to some 4,000 strong. According to David Caute, its often wealthy members were "able to contribute as much to [Communist] Party funds as the whole American working class," although they may not have been intending to support the Party cause.

Parker also served as chair of the Joint Anti-Fascist Refugee Committee's fundraising arm, "Spanish Refugee Appeal". She organized Project Rescue Ship to transport Loyalist veterans to Mexico, headed Spanish Children's Relief, and lent her name to many other left-wing causes and organizations. Her former Round Table friends saw less and less of her, and her relationship with Robert Benchley became particularly strained (although they would reconcile). Parker met S. J. Perelman at a party in 1932 and, despite a rocky start (Perelman called it "a scarifying ordeal"), they remained friends for the next 35 years. They became neighbors when the Perelmans helped Parker and Campbell buy a run-down farm in Bucks County, Pennsylvania, near New Hope, a popular summer destination among many writers and artists from New York.

Parker was listed as a Communist by the publication Red Channels in 1950. The FBI compiled a 1,000-page dossier on her because of her suspected involvement in Communism during the era when Senator Joseph McCarthy was raising alarms about communists in government and Hollywood. As a result, movie studio bosses placed her on the Hollywood blacklist. Her final screenplay was The Fan, a 1949 adaptation of Oscar Wilde's Lady Windermere's Fan, directed by Otto Preminger.

Her marriage to Campbell was tempestuous, with tensions exacerbated by Parker's increasing alcohol consumption and Campbell's long-term affair with a married woman in Europe during World War II. They divorced in 1947, remarried in 1950, then separated in 1952 when Parker moved back to New York. From 1957 to 1962, she lived at the Volney Residential Hotel on Manhattan's Upper East Side and wrote book reviews for Esquire magazine. Her writing became increasingly erratic owing to her continued abuse of alcohol. She returned to Hollywood in 1961, reconciled with Campbell, and collaborated with him on a number of unproduced projects until Campbell died from a drug overdose in 1963.

Later life and death 
Following Campbell's death, Parker returned to New York City and the Volney Residential hotel. In her later years, she denigrated the Algonquin Round Table, although it had brought her such early notoriety:

Parker occasionally participated in radio programs, including Information Please (as a guest) and Author, Author (as a regular panelist). She wrote for the Columbia Workshop, and both Ilka Chase and Tallulah Bankhead used her material for radio monologues.

Parker died on June 7, 1967, of a heart attack at the age of 73. In her will, she bequeathed her estate to Martin Luther King Jr., and upon King's death, to the NAACP.

Burial

Following her cremation, Parker's ashes were unclaimed for several years. Finally, in 1973, the crematorium sent them to her lawyer's office; by then he had retired, and the ashes remained in his colleague Paul O'Dwyer's filing cabinet for approximately 17 years. In 1988, O'Dwyer brought this situation to public attention, with the aid of celebrity columnist Liz Smith; after some discussion, the NAACP claimed Parker's remains and designed a memorial garden for them outside its Baltimore headquarters. The plaque read,

In early 2020, the NAACP moved its headquarters to downtown Baltimore and the question about what would happen to Parker's ashes became the topic of much speculation, especially after the NAACP formally announced it would later move to Washington, D.C.

The NAACP restated that Parker's ashes will ultimately be where her family wishes her to be. "It’s important to us that we do this right,” said the NAACP.

Relatives called for the ashes to be moved to the family's plot in Woodlawn Cemetery, in the Bronx, where a place had been reserved for Parker by her father. On August 18, 2020, Parker's urn was exhumed. "Two executives from the N.A.A.C.P. spoke, and a rabbi who had attended her initial burial said Kaddish." On August 22, 2020, Parker was re-buried privately in Woodlawn, with the possibility of a more public ceremony later. "Her legacy means a lot," added representatives from the NAACP.

Honors

On August 22, 1992, the 99th anniversary of Parker's birth, the United States Postal Service issued a 29¢ U.S. commemorative postage stamp in the Literary Arts series. The Algonquin Round Table, as well as the number of other literary and theatrical greats who lodged at the hotel, contributed to the Algonquin Hotel's being designated in 1987 as a New York City Historic Landmark. In 1996, the hotel was designated as a National Literary Landmark by the Friends of Libraries USA, based on the contributions of Parker and other members of the Round Table. The organization's bronze plaque is attached to the front of the hotel. Parker's birthplace at the Jersey Shore was also designated a National Literary Landmark by Friends of Libraries USA in 2005 and a bronze plaque marks the former site of her family house.

In 2014, Parker was elected to the New Jersey Hall of Fame.

In popular culture 
Parker inspired a number of fictional characters in several plays of her day. These included "Lily Malone" in Philip Barry's Hotel Universe (1932), "Mary Hilliard" (played by Ruth Gordon) in George Oppenheimer's Here Today (1932), "Paula Wharton" in Gordon's 1944 play Over Twenty-one (directed by George S. Kaufman), and "Julia Glenn" in the Kaufman–Moss Hart collaboration Merrily We Roll Along (1934). Kaufman's representation of her in Merrily We Roll Along led Parker, once his Round Table compatriot, to despise him. She also was portrayed as "Daisy Lester" in Charles Brackett's 1934 novel Entirely Surrounded. She is mentioned in the original introductory lyrics in Cole Porter's song "Just One of Those Things" from the 1935 Broadway musical Jubilee, which have been retained in the standard interpretation of the song as part of the Great American Songbook.

Prince released "The Ballad of Dorothy Parker" in 1987; it was the first song recorded in his Chanhassen, Minnesota studio home.  Those closest to him at the time suggest the association between the poet and the waitress by the same name in the song is a coincidence, but Dorothy Parker died on Prince's 9th birthday and chances are this brought her to his attention prior to writing the song.

Parker is featured as a character in the novel The Dorothy Parker Murder Case by George Baxt (1984), in a series of Algonquin Round Table Mysteries by J. J. Murphy (2011– ), and in Ellen Meister's novel Farewell, Dorothy Parker (2013). She is the main character in "Love For Miss Dottie", a short story by Larry N Mayer, which was selected by writer Mary Gaitskill for the collection Best New American Voices 2009 (Harcourt).

She has been portrayed on film and television by Dolores Sutton in F. Scott Fitzgerald in Hollywood (1976), Rosemary Murphy in Julia (1977), Bebe Neuwirth in Dash and Lilly (1999), and Jennifer Jason Leigh in Mrs. Parker and the Vicious Circle (1994). Neuwirth was nominated for an Emmy Award for her performance, and Leigh received a number of awards and nominations, including a Golden Globe nomination.

The Wild Colonials song, "Vicious Circle" from Life As We Know It EP (2007) is about Dorothy Parker. The chorus lyrics are, "I know how Dorothy Parker felt with someone in her way."

Television creator Amy Sherman-Palladino named her production company 'Dorothy Parker Drank Here Productions' in tribute to Parker.

Tucson actress Lesley Abrams wrote and performed the one-woman show Dorothy Parker's Last Call in 2009 in Tucson, Arizona at the Winding Road Theater Ensemble. She reprised the role at the Live Theatre Workshop in Tucson in 2014. The play was selected to be part of the Capital Fringe Festival in DC in 2010.

In 2016, American actress Victoria Scott donned a Halloween costume of Parker in episode 5, season 8 of Modern Family.

In 2018, American drag queen Miz Cracker played Parker in the celebrity-impersonation game show episode of the Season 10 of Rupaul's Drag Race.

In the 2018 film Can You Ever Forgive Me? (based on the 2008 memoir of the same name), Melissa McCarthy plays Lee Israel, an author who for a time forged original letters in Dorothy Parker's name.

Adaptations
In the 2010s some of her poems from the early 20th century have been set to music by the composer Marcus Paus as the operatic song cycle Hate Songs for Mezzo-Soprano and Orchestra (2014); Paus's Hate Songs was included on Tora Augestad's and the Oslo Philharmonic's album Portraying Passion: Works by Weill/Paus/Ives (2018) with works by Paus, Kurt Weill and Charles Ives. It was described by musicologist Ralph P. Locke as "one of the most engaging works" in recent years; "the cycle expresses Parker's favorite theme: how awful human beings are, especially the male of the species."

In 2014, lyrics taken from her book of poetry Not So Deep as a Well were, with the authorization of the NAACP, used by Canadian singer Myriam Gendron to create a folk album of the same name. Also in 2014, Chicago jazz bassist/singer/composer Katie Ernst issued her album Little Words, consisting of her authorized settings of seven of Parker's poems.

In 2021 her book Men I'm Not Married To was adapted as an opera of the same name by composer Lisa DeSpain and librettist Rachel J. Peters. It premiered virtually as part of Operas in Place and Virtual Festival of New Operas commissioned by Baldwin Wallace Conservatory Voice Performance, Cleveland Opera Theater, and On Site Opera on February 18, 2021.

Bibliography

Essays and reporting
 
 
  (compilation of reviews, edited by Fitzpatrick; most of these reviews have never been reprinted)
Short story: A Telephone Call

Short fiction 

Collections
 1930: Laments for the Living (includes 13 short stories)
 1933: After Such Pleasures (includes 11 short stories)
 1939: Here Lies: The Collected Stories of Dorothy Parker (reprints of the stories from both previous collections, plus 3 new stories)
 1942: Collected Stories
 1944: The Portable Dorothy Parker (reprints of the stories from the previous collections, plus 5 new stories and verse from 3 poetry books)
 1995: Complete Stories (Penguin Books)

Poetry
Collections
 1926: Enough Rope
 1928: Sunset Gun
 1931: Death and Taxes
 1936: Collected Poems: Not So Deep as a Well
 1944: Collected Poetry
 1996: Not Much Fun: The Lost Poems of Dorothy Parker (UK title: The Uncollected Dorothy Parker)
 2009: Not Much Fun: The Lost Poems of Dorothy Parker (2nd ed., with additional poems)
List of poems

Plays 
 1929: Close Harmony (with Elmer Rice)
 1949: The Coast of Illyria (with Ross Evans), about the murder of Mary and Charles Lamb's mother by Mary
 1953: Ladies of the Corridor (with Arnaud D'Usseau)

Screenplays 
 1936: Suzy (with Alan Campbell, Horace Jackson and Lenore J. Coffee; based on	a novel by Herman Gorman)
 1937: A Star is Born (with William A. Wellman, Robert Carson and Alan Campbell)
 1938: Sweethearts (with Alan Campbell, Laura Perelman and S.J. Perelman)
 1938: Trade Winds (with Alan Campbell and Frank R. Adams; story by Tay Garnett)
 1941: Week-End for Three (with Alan Campbell; story by Budd Schulberg)
 1942: Saboteur (with Peter Viertel and Joan Harrison)
 1947: Smash-Up, the Story of a Woman (with Frank Cavett, John Howard Lawson and Lionel Wiggam)
 1949: The Fan (with Walter Reisch and Ross Evans; based on Lady Windermere's Fan by Oscar Wilde)

Critical studies and reviews of Parker's work

See also 

 Dorothy Parker – Complete Stories
 "Here We Are" (short story)

References

Further reading 
Randall Calhoun, Dorothy Parker: A Bio-Bibliography. Westport, Connecticut: Greenwood Press, 1993. 
 Kevin C. Fitzpatrick, A Journey into Dorothy Parker's New York. Berkeley, CA: Roaring Forties Press, 2005. 
 John Keats, You Might As Well Live: The Life and Times of Dorothy Parker. New York: Simon & Schuster, 1970.
 Marion Meade, Dorothy Parker: What Fresh Hell is This?. New York: Villard, 1988.
 S. J. Perelman, "Dorothy Parker". In The Last Laugh. New York: Simon & Schuster, 1981.

External links 

 
 
 
 
 Dorothy Parker Society
 Algonquin Round Table
 Dorothy Parker on Poeticous
 Selected Poems by Dorothy Parker
 Parker's resting place
 Emdashes coverage of Dorothy Parker
 Dorothy Parker photo gallery; GettyImages

Online editions 
 
 
 
 
 Minstrels Archive section on Parker's works

1893 births
1967 deaths
20th-century American non-fiction writers
20th-century American poets
20th-century American short story writers
20th-century American women writers
Actresses from New York City
American anti-fascists
American humorists
American humorous poets
American people of German-Jewish descent
American people of Scottish descent
American satirists
American socialists
American women non-fiction writers
American women poets
American women screenwriters
American women short story writers
Hollywood blacklist
Journalists from New York City
Jewish American writers
O. Henry Award winners
People from Long Branch, New Jersey
People from the Upper West Side
Poets from New Jersey
Screenwriters from New Jersey
Screenwriters from New York (state)
The New Yorker people
Women satirists
Writers from Manhattan
20th-century American screenwriters
Conversationalists
Algonquin Round Table
20th-century American Jews
Members of the American Academy of Arts and Letters